David or Dave Wilson may refer to:

Arts and literature 
 David Wilson (artist) (1873–1935), Irish illustrator and painter
 Sir David M. Wilson (born 1931), British archaeologist and director of the British Museum
 David Henry Wilson (born 1937), English writer
 David Niall Wilson (born 1959), American writer of horror, science fiction and fantasy fiction
 David Hildebrand Wilson, founder of the Museum of Jurassic Technology
 David C. Wilson (screenwriter), American screenwriter
 David Fenwick Wilson (born 1929), musicologist and organist

Entertainment 
 David Wilson (violinist) (born 1945), American violinist
 David Wilson (director), British music video director
 David Wilson (born 1948), birth name of Scottish stage and television actor David Rintoul
 Dave Wilson (director) (1933–2002), American television director
 Dave Wilson (radio personality), American radio personality based in Indianapolis
 David S. F. Wilson, American director; see Bloodshot
 David Wilson (criminologist) (born 1957), British criminologist

Government 
 David Wilson (parliamentary official) (born 1970), clerk of the New Zealand House of Representatives
 Dave Wilson (Cape Breton politician) (born 1955), Canadian politician and former member of the Nova Scotia House of Assembly
 Dave Wilson (Sackville politician) (born 1970), Canadian politician and member of the Nova Scotia House of Assembly
 David Wilson (Manitoba politician) (1858–1927), Irish-born politician in Manitoba, Canada
 David Wilson (New York politician) (1818–1870), New York assemblyman 1852, editor of Twelve Years a Slave
 David Wilson (New Zealand politician) (1880–1977), New Zealand politician and diplomat
 David Wilson, Baron Wilson of Tillyorn (born 1935), British administrator, governor of Hong Kong (1987–1992), diplomat and Sinologist
 David H. Wilson (politician) (1855–1926), politician in Manitoba, Canada
 David John Wilson (1887–1976), judge of the United States Customs Court
 David C. Wilson (businessman) (1789–1865), banker railroad executive and mayor of Wilmington, Delaware
 David L. Wilson (born 1950), member of the Delaware House of Representatives
 David S. Wilson (born ca. 1981), American politician
 Sir David Wilson (governor), British colonial administrator and military officer

Science 
 David Gordon Wilson (1928–2019), British-born American professor of engineering
 David Sloan Wilson (born 1949), American evolutionary biologist

Sports

Association football 
 Soldier Wilson (David Wilson, 1883–1906), English footballer who played for Leeds City
 David Wilson (Queen's Park footballer) (1880–1926), Scottish footballer (Queen's Park FC and Scotland)
 David Wilson (footballer, born 1881) (1881–?), Scottish footballer, played for Hearts, Everton, Portsmouth
 David Wilson (footballer, born 1884) (1884–1959), Scotland international footballer; after retiring he was manager for Nelson and Exeter City in England
 David Wilson (footballer, born c. 1908) (1908–1992), English footballer who played for Hamilton Academical and Stranraer in the 1930s
 Davie Wilson (1939–2022), Scottish footballer, played for Rangers, Dundee United, Dumbarton, Kilmarnock
 Dave Wilson (footballer, born 1942), played for Preston and Liverpool
 Dave Wilson (footballer, born 1944), played for Nottingham Forest, Carlisle United, Grimsby Town, Walsall, Burnley, Chesterfield
 David Wilson (footballer, born 1969), footballer who began his career at Manchester United (1980s)
 David Wilson (footballer, born 1994), Scottish footballer who plays for Partick Thistle
 David Wilson (Scottish football manager) (born 1974), Scottish football manager of Gibraltar national football team
 David A. Wilson (1875–?), English footballer

Rugby football 
 David Wilson (rugby union, born 1967), Australian rugby union footballer
 David Wilson (rugby union, born 1985), English rugby union player
 Dave Wilson (rugby league) (born 1984), British rugby league player

Other sports 
 David Wilson (hurdler) (born 1951), British hurdler
 Dave Wilson (American football) (born 1959), American football quarterback
 Dave Wilson (swimmer) (born 1960), American swimmer & silver medalist at the 1984 Olympics
 David Wilson (swimmer) (born 1966), Australian swimmer
 David Wilson (cricketer, born 1917) (1917–2005), English cricketer
 David Wilson (cricketer, born 1966), English cricketer
 David Wilson (New Zealand cricketer) (1914–1989), New Zealand cricketer
 David Wilson (figure skating) (born 1966), Canadian figure skating choreographer
 David Wilson (defensive back) (born 1970), American football defensive back
 David Wilson (sprinter) (born 1977), Guamanian sprinter
 David Wilson (running back) (born 1991), American football running back
 Dave Wilson (high jumper), English athlete

Other people 
 David Wilson (sex offender) (born 1984), British criminal
 David Wilson (hotelier) (1808–1880), hotelier
 Sir David Wilson, 1st Baronet (1855–1930), Scottish landowner and agriculturalist
 David Wilson (dean of St Patrick's Cathedral, Dublin) (1871–1957), Irish Anglican priest and hymnist
 David Wilson (dean of Aberdeen and Orkney) (1805–1880)
 David Wilson (barrister) (1879–1965), Australian barrister
 David Wilson (Royal Marines officer) (born 1949), Royal Marine general
 David Wilson (murderer) (died 1998), executed Saint Kitts and Nevis criminal
 David Wilson (university administrator), American academic, Chancellor of University of Wisconsin Colleges
 David G. Wilson, assistant producer for the James Bond films
 David K. Wilson (1919–2007), American businessman and philanthropist
 W. David Wilson, chair of the Ontario Securities Commission
 David Wilson (U.S. Army general), United States Army general

See also 
 David Willson (disambiguation)
 Wilson (name)